= Rewlatch =

- Location within Gauteng Location within South Africa
- Coordinates: 26.243°S 28.073°E
- Country: South Africa
- Province: Gauteng
- Municipality: City of Johannesburg
- Main Place: Johannesburg

Area
  - Total: 0.42 km^{2} (0.16 sq mi)

Population (2011)
  - Total: 1,010
  - Density: 2,400/km^{2} (6,200/sq mi)

Racial makeup (2011)
  - Black African: 33.4%
  - Coloured: 13.6%
  - Indian/Asian: 6.0%
  - White: 41.0%
  - Other: 6.0%

First languages (2011)
  - English: 50.0%
  - Afrikaans: 12.7%
  - Zulu: 6.4%
  - Xhosa: 3.9%
  - Other: 27.0%
- Time zone: UTC+2 (SAST)
- Postal code (street): 2197

Rewlatch is a suburb of Johannesburg, South Africa. It is located in Region F of the City of Johannesburg Metropolitan Municipality.
